Robert "IronE" Singleton (born November 30, 1975) is an American actor. He is best known for portraying Alton in The Blind Side and for starring as Theodore "T-Dog" Douglas in the AMC series The Walking Dead. Since leaving the cast of The Walking Dead he has continued to be involved in fan events and conventions as well as developing his own one-man show Blindsided by The Walking Dead.

Early life
Singleton was born and raised in Atlanta, Georgia. He graduated from the University of Georgia, where he majored in speech communication and theatre. He played defensive back for the Georgia Bulldogs for two years until Champ Bailey, Kirby Smart, and several other highly recruited defensive backs joined the team. He then switched to running back.

Filmography

Film

Television

References

External links

Living people
Male actors from Atlanta
University of Georgia alumni
Georgia Bulldogs football players
American male film actors
African-American male actors
American male television actors
1975 births
21st-century African-American people
20th-century African-American people